Roberta Vinci was the defending champion, but chose not to participate that year.

Nuria Llagostera Vives won in the final 6–0, 6–4, against María Emilia Salerni.

Seeds

Draw

Finals

Top half

Bottom half

External links
Draw and Qualifying Draw

Singles
Copa Colsanitas